Enrique Tejeda (born 1 May 1905, date of death unknown) was a Cuban sports shooter. He competed in the 50 m pistol event at the 1948 Summer Olympics.

References

1905 births
Year of death missing
Cuban male sport shooters
Olympic shooters of Cuba
Shooters at the 1948 Summer Olympics
Place of birth missing
20th-century Cuban people